The Man Trackers is a 1921 American silent Western film directed by Edward A. Kull and starring George Larkin, Josephine Hill and Albert J. Smith.

Plot

Cast
 George Larkin as Jimmy Hearn
 Josephine Hill as Molly Killbride
 Albert J. Smith as Hanley 
 Barney Furey as Jules
 Ruth Royce as Lizette
 Harold Holland as Inspector
 Ralph McCullough as Morgan

References

Bibliography
 Connelly, Robert B. The Silents: Silent Feature Films, 1910-36, Volume 40, Issue 2. December Press, 1998.
 Munden, Kenneth White. The American Film Institute Catalog of Motion Pictures Produced in the United States, Part 1. University of California Press, 1997.

External links
 

1921 films
1921 Western (genre) films
Silent American Western (genre) films
American black-and-white films
American silent feature films
1920s English-language films
Films directed by Edward A. Kull
Films with screenplays by George H. Plympton
Universal Pictures films
1920s American films